Daniel Phillip Wood (born October 31, 1962) is a Canadian former ice hockey player who was a member of the 1984 Canadian Olympic team, which finished out of the medals at the Sarajevo Games. He was selected by the St. Louis Blues in the 9th round (188th overall) of the 1981 NHL Entry Draft.

After a long career he retired in the early 1990s, since then he has not been involved in the hockey scene.

References

External links

1962 births
Living people
Anaheim Ducks announcers
Canadian expatriate ice hockey players in the United States
Canadian ice hockey right wingers
Fredericton Express players
Ice hockey players at the 1984 Winter Olympics
Kingston Canadians players
Montana Magic players
Olympic ice hockey players of Canada
Peoria Rivermen (IHL) players
Salt Lake Golden Eagles (CHL) players
Ice hockey people from Toronto
Springfield Indians players
St. Louis Blues draft picks